The Order of Lutheran Franciscans (OLF) is a religious order affiliated with the Evangelical Lutheran Church in America (ELCA), founded in 2011.

The Order is open to members of ELCA Lutheran congregations, married or single, lay or ordained, who vow to live according to "the spirit and practice" of the Evangelical Counsels of Poverty, Chastity and Obedience, as interpreted by the Order. Individuals become members through a period of formation which includes postulancy, the novitiate, and ultimately, life profession. The Order also has an associate designation, called Friends of the Order.

The mission of the Order is to "passionately follow Jesus, rebuilding his Church, living lives of mutual care and accountability in harmony with the creeds and confessions of the Lutheran Church and both in the spirit and practice of the Evangelical Counsels, faithfully following the simple way of Saint Francis of Assisi.

The Order of Lutheran Franciscans is part of the larger family of Franciscans, ecumenical in its endeavors, seeking to work with other Franciscans in the rebuilding of Christ's Church, care of creation, and justice for the poor and marginalized.

References

External links 
 http://www.lutheranfranciscans.org

Evangelical Lutheran Church in America
Lutheran orders and societies
Franciscan spirituality in Protestantism